"Blue, Red and Grey" is the eighth song on the Who's 1975 album The Who by Numbers. An acoustic ballad featuring the song's writer, Pete Townshend, on lead vocals, the song is generally considered one of the lighter songs on the album.

Background
"Blue, Red and Grey" is sung by Pete Townshend, with the only instrumentation being Townshend on ukulele and John Entwistle playing horns. A group version of the song was recorded, but the recording was apparently lost.

Although Roger Daltrey, who was absent on the final track, claimed that the song was one of his favorites off the album, Townshend disliked the song and did not want it to be released. However, producer Glyn Johns successfully pushed for its inclusion on The Who by Numbers.

The song cross-fades with "They Are All In Love" in the 1996 remaster of the album, but in the original version, it did not.

Lyrics
In contrast to many songs on The Who by Numbers, "Blue, Red and Grey" features mostly positive lyrics, with a repeating phrase of "I like every minute of the day" being repeated throughout the song.

Reception
Rolling Stone named the song as the 17th best song by the Who, stating, Blue, Red and Grey' was a moment of optimism amid the darkness, a simple, oddly beautiful ode to enjoying life that was written on the ukulele and recorded on a home demo". Stephen Thomas Erlewine of AllMusic praised the song's "grace", while Robert Christgau of The Village Voice named the song as one of the two on the album that "break out of the bind".

References

1975 songs
The Who songs
Songs written by Pete Townshend
Song recordings produced by Glyn Johns
Pete Townshend songs